William Cross may refer to:

William Cross (politician) (1856–1892), British Member of Parliament for Liverpool West Derby, 1888–1893
William Cross (rower) (1908–1993), Australian Olympic rower
William Cross (rugby union) (1851–1890), Scottish rugby union player and referee
William E. Cross Jr. (born 1940), professor at the CUNY Graduate Center
Will Cross, American mountain climber
Willie Cross (1883–1949), Scottish footballer
The pseudonym of John Williams (convict), transported to Van Diemen's Land
Bill Cross (1917–2015), British soldier
Billy Cross (American football) (1929–2013), American football player

See also
Billy Cross (born 1946), American guitarist, singer and producer